Ivești is a commune in Vaslui County, Western Moldavia, Romania. It is composed of a single village, Ivești. It included three other villages until 2004, when they were split off to form Pogonești Commune.

References

Communes in Vaslui County
Localities in Western Moldavia